Gladys Bronwyn Stern or GB Stern (17 June 1890 – 20 September 1973), born Gladys Bertha Stern in London, England, wrote many novels, short stories, plays, memoirs, biographies and literary criticism.  The National Portrait Gallery, London holds four portraits of her.

Career

GB Stern was born on 17 June 1890 in North Kensington, London, the second, by some years, of two sisters. Her family lost their money in the Vaal River diamond crash. After that, they lived in a series of apartments, hotels and boarding houses. Gladys was schooled in England until the age of 16, when, with her parents, she traveled to the continent and studied in Germany and Switzerland.

She wrote her first novel, Pantomime, in 1914 at the age of 24. Her first critical success came with Twos and Threes in 1916. Her most popular books were the series known by the name of the first, The Matriarch. This was first published as Tents of Israel in 1924. The others in the series are A Deputy Was King (1926), Mosaic (1930), Shining and Free (1935) and The Young Matriarch (1942).

The Matriarch series revolved around the Rakonitz and Czelovar families and were based on her own family. They are well-to-do and cosmopolitan Jews who settled in England from Hungary, Poland, Russia, and Austria. Like her family, they suffer through an economic crash.

The first book in the series, The Matriarch, centers around two characters, the matriarch Anastasia and her granddaughter, Toni. Anastasia was based on Stern's great-aunt, who was incensed with the portrayal until the book became successful. The book describes in detail the complicated, florid and noisy life of this Jewish-English family through both triumphs and failures, weddings and funerals.

Stern's plays include The Man Who Pays The Piper (1931), which was revived by the Orange Tree Theatre in Richmond, London in 2013.

With Sheila Kaye-Smith she wrote the dialogues Talking of Jane Austen and More Talk of Jane Austen. She also wrote a biography of Robert Louis Stevenson.
Her final novel, Promise Not to Tell, was published in 1964.<ref
name="Orlando"></ref>

In 1934, Long Lost Father was adapted into a film of the same title by RKO Pictures.
In 1947, The Woman in the Hall was released as a film of the same title.
In 1966 her 1938 novel The Ugly Dachshund was made into a film of the same title.

Personal life

She married New Zealander Geoffrey Lisle Holdsworth in 1919 and divorced him "fairly soon after". Her closest male friends were the playwright John van Druten and Jack Cohen. A long-time friend was Rebecca West, who came to call her "Peter", as did most of Stern's friends. Stern went through a number of secretaries but Freda Bromhead managed to survive five years with her and came back to help her years later when Stern was in a nursing home.

Her family was never terribly religious and Stern herself disliked the word 'Jew' and preferred 'Israelite'.  In 1947 she converted to Catholicism. She wrote about the conversion in 1954 in All in Good Time.

She died in Wallingford, Oxfordshire, England on 28 September 1973, at the age of 83.

Works

References

Sources

External links

 
 
 
Bibliography of GB Stern’s works
Hall, Lesley (17 November 2002).  G.B. Stern – brief bibliography (based on the British Library catalogue)

1890 births
1973 deaths
20th-century English dramatists and playwrights
20th-century British short story writers
20th-century English novelists
20th-century English women writers
British women short story writers
Converts to Roman Catholicism from Judaism
English biographers
English literary critics
Women literary critics
English memoirists
English short story writers
English women dramatists and playwrights
English women journalists
English women non-fiction writers
English women novelists
People educated at Notting Hill & Ealing High School
People from Kensington
British women memoirists
Writers from London
British women biographers